Emergency vehicle equipment is used in the United Kingdom to indicate urgent journeys by an emergency service.  This usage is colloquially known as "blues and twos", which refers to the blue lights and the two-tone siren once commonplace (although most sirens now have a range of tones like Wail, Yelp and Phaser). A call-out requiring the use of lights and sirens is often colloquially known as a "blue light run".

Permitted use

In the United Kingdom, the use of blue lights is regulated by the Road Vehicles Lighting Regulations 1989, and sirens by the Road Vehicles Construction and Use Regulations 1986, both as amended by various other pieces of legislation (see right). The 1989 restrictions state that no vehicle, other than an emergency vehicle, shall be fitted with a "blue warning beacon or special warning lamp", or a device which resembles a blue warning beacon or a special warning lamp, whether it works or not.

Each of the emergency services listed above has different policies regarding the use of blue lights and sirens. Most require the driver to be trained to a particular standard in response driving, but currently, no national standard exists. Provision exists for a national standard to be required in order to utilise speed limit exemptions, but this has not been brought into force.

Road traffic exemptions

In the UK, vehicles used for certain purposes may have exemptions from some road traffic regulations whilst responding to an emergency. Merely being authorised to use blue lights and sirens does not of itself grant exemptions from road traffic law. These exemptions apply whether or not blue lights and/or sirens are being used, although it is mainly desirable:
 treating a red traffic light as a give way sign
 passing to the right of a keep left or keep right sign (but not disobeying a turn left, turn right, or ahead only sign)
 driving on a motorway hard shoulder (even against the direction of traffic)
 exceeding the statutory speed limit (police, fire and ambulance purposes only; and special forces purposes only for national security emergencies where the driver is trained or is being trained in high-speed driving)
 stopping on zig-zag lines
 parking in restricted areas, including against flow of traffic at night
 leaving the vehicle with the engine running, normally the offence of "quitting" (police and ambulance utilising the run lock feature on most cars)
 using audible warnings outside permitted hours

See also 
Battenburg markings
Code 3 Response

References

Emergency vehicles
Law enforcement in the United Kingdom